Alpha Tau Alpha is a National Professional Honorary Agricultural Education Organization for those who have chosen a major in agricultural education or extension education.

History 
The general purpose of vocational agriculture-to educate present and prospective farmers for proficiency in farming—created throughout this nation a band of men dedicated to the improvement of agriculture through education. These men were of a unique profession and one individual, Dr. A. W Nolan, conceived the idea of a professional organization for them.

On , a group of men at the University of Illinois, College of Agriculture, met to plan and organize a group for those pursuing a career in Agricultural Education or Extension Education. On , plans were developed to nationalize the fraternity. After the plans were in place, the corresponding secretary was elected in March 1923 to contact other colleges concerning the organization of Alpha Tau Alpha chapters. Colleges with an Agricultural Education or Extension Education program were contacted. On , the University of Illinois granted Alpha chapter of  a permit for a national constitution.

The interest of A. W. Nolan in Alpha Tau Alpha continued beyond his retirement at the University of Illinois in 1938. He served as president until the national fraternity was reactivated following World War II.

Organization Insignia 
The Insignia was designed for the use of the national organization or local chapters. Parts of the Insignia are the equilateral triangle with the words Physical, Intellectual, and Spiritual making up the three sides, an  bond of fellowship that ties the sides together, the open book and the lamp of knowledge, supported by two sheaves of wheat. The Insignia is protected by copyright.

The official colors of Alpha Tau Alpha are orange and brown.

Purpose 
The purpose of Alpha Tau Alpha is to promote the highest standards of agricultural education and a more intimate acquaintance and closer relationship with individuals who have chosen a major in agricultural education or extension education. By studying the life, preparation, and personality of great educators, by a better understanding of various aspects of the great vocations in agriculture, and life of the people engaged therein, members aspire to become such agricultural educators as shall wisely and sufficiently lead those who have chosen the vocation of agriculture, into fuller lives of success and happiness.

 members seek to find and enjoy the fellowship of individuals of high scholarship, of true teaching ideals, and of sincere desire to serve in agricultural leadership.

Chapters 
Chapters as noted by the national website or Baird's.  Chapters in bold are active, chapters in italics are inactive. (Unknown status in plain text await clarification.)

Membership Types 
A. Active Membership
- Qualifications for active membership in Alpha Tau Alpha may exceed, if a chapter wishes, but shall not be less than the following:
 Be an Agricultural Education or Extension Education major (or equivalent) or have an emphasis in this area.
 Be enrolled in at least the sophomore year as defined by the local department.
 Have at least a 2.5 GPA on a 4.0 scale or a 3.5 GPA on a 5.0 scale.

B. Associate Membership
- Associate membership shall be limited to those persons actively engaged in agricultural education or extension education professions.

C. Honorary Membership
 Honorary membership shall be limited to those persons engaged in agricultural leadership; to those desiring to promote the welfare of community life; and to those promoting agricultural education.
 Nominations with the appropriate information about each nominee shall be submitted to the national secretary at least one month prior to the National Conclave. A screening committee, composed of one national officer and two student members appointed by the national president, shall investigate the nominations and make recommendations at a business session of the National Conclave. Two-thirds (2/3) of the delegates present at the Conclave showing an affirmative vote is sufficient to elect new honorary members to membership. The initiation of the new members will be held at the National Conclave the following year.

D. National Membership
- When the national initiation fee is received by the national secretary, the members of chapters automatically become members of the national body and constitute the membership of the organization.

E. Transfer of Membership
- Membership may be transferred from one chapter to another at the member's request, by notifying the secretary of the chapter the member is joining and notifying the national secretary of the transfer and the roll number assigned to the member.

Today

National Conclave
The Alpha Tau Alpha National Conclave is held in conjunction with the National FFA Convention each October. All  chapters are invited to attend. Business meetings are held in which any delegate matters are voted on by all attending chapters. During National Conclave, contests are held for chapters to participate against one another.

 Essay Contest
 Debate Contest
 Quiz Bowl Contest
 Parliamentary Procedure
 Program of Excellence

See also
 Agricultural Education
 Professional fraternities and sororities

References 

Honor societies
Student organizations established in 1921
1921 establishments in Illinois